Alexej is a given name. Notable people with the name include:

 Alexej Čepička
 Alexej Jaškin
 Alexej Pludek, Czech writer
 Alexej Prochorow, German weightlifter
 Alexej Stachowitsch
 Alexej von Jawlensky
 Josef Alexej Eisenberger

See also 
 Alexis